Can (Korean: 캔 "can") is a South Korean male duo formed in 1998. Their members consist of Lee Jong-won and Bae Ki-sung. Can is currently signed to JJ Holic Media. Can released their first album, Version 1.0 on October 18, 1998.

Discography

Albums
 Version 1.0 (1998)
 Genderless (2000)
 Can with Piano (2001)
 Gray Market (2003)
 My Way (2005)
 Old & New (2006)
 Hot Summer Play (2007)
 The 10th Anniversary - Variation (2008)

Awards and nominations

References

External links
JJ Holic Media

1998 establishments in South Korea
Musical groups established in 1998
South Korean rock music groups
South Korean pop rock music groups
South Korean pop music groups
K-pop music groups
South Korean dance music groups